The Ivory Snuff Box is a 1915 American silent mystery film directed by Maurice Tourneur and starring Holbrook Blinn, Alma Belwin and Norman Trevor.

Cast
 Holbrook Blinn as Richard Duvall  
 Alma Belwin as Grace Ellicot  
 Norman Trevor as Dr. Hartmann  
 Robert Cummings as Prefect of Police

References

Bibliography
 Waldman, Harry. Maurice Tourneur: The Life and Films. McFarland, 2001.

External links

1915 films
1915 mystery films
American mystery films
Films directed by Maurice Tourneur
American silent feature films
American black-and-white films
1910s English-language films
1910s American films
Silent mystery films